Wyndham-Quin is a surname, and may refer to:
 Edwin Wyndham-Quin, 3rd Earl of Dunraven and Mount-Earl (1812-1871), British Peer
 Richard Wyndham-Quin, 6th Earl of Dunraven (1887-1965), Irish Peer
 Thady Wyndham-Quin, 7th Earl of Dunraven and Mount-Earl (born 1939), Earl in the Peerage of Ireland
 Windham Wyndham-Quin (disambiguation), several people

See also
 Quin (disambiguation)
 Wyndham
 

Compound surnames